Often synonymous to anti-foundationalism, non-essentialism in philosophy is the non-belief in an essence (from Latin esse) of any given thing, idea, or metaphysical entity (e.g. God). Non-essentialism might also be defined cataphatically (i.e. affirmatively; see cataphatic theology) as the belief that for any entity, there are no specific traits or ground of being which entities of that kind must possess to be considered "that entity."

Non-essentialism is not restricted to general philosophical speculation. It is also found in academic disciplines such as sociology, anthropology, theology, history/historiography and science. How non-essentialism is used in these discourses varies a bit given their different content and subject matter.

Criticism
Edward Feser describes the position as not only untenable logically but psychologically impossible. In his book Aristotle's Revenge he argues that one cannot say the universe essentially doesn't have an essence without violating the Law of noncontradiction.

See also 
 Adiaphora
 Anatta
 Essentialism
 Existentialism
 Nominalism
 Social constructionism

Citations

References

Essentialism
Metaphysical theories